Oreolalax xiangchengensis (Xiangcheng lazy toad or Xiangcheng toothed toad) is a species of amphibian in the family Megophryidae. It is endemic to China where it can be found in western Sichuan and in the Hengduan Mountains in northern Yunnan. Its range includes Baimaxueshan, Habaxueshan, Panzhihua-Sutie, and Yading Nature Reserves.

Its natural habitats are temperate forests, rivers, and freshwater springs. It is threatened by habitat loss.

References

Oreolalax
Amphibians of China
Endemic fauna of China
Taxonomy articles created by Polbot
Amphibians described in 1983